The Coca-Cola Trophy was a series of criterium cycling races held annually throughout Germany from 1979 to 2000. The competition consisted of up to eight races contested in different German cities, generally located in the south of the country such as Sindelfingen, Heilbronn, Ulm, Erlangen, Regensburg, all of which contributing to the overall title.

Winners

References

Cycle races in Germany
Recurring sporting events established in 1979
1979 establishments in Germany
Recurring sporting events disestablished in 2000
2000 disestablishments in Germany
Defunct cycling races in Germany